Lewchewan may refer to:
 Ryukyuan languages (Lewchewan languages)
 Ryukyuan people (Lewchewan people)

See also 
 Ryukyuan (disambiguation)